Calangute is a town in the North Goa district of the Indian state of Goa. It is famous for its beach, the largest in North Goa and a popular tourist destination. The peak tourist season is during Christmas and New Year, and during the summer in May. During the monsoon season, from June through September, the sea can be rough and swimming is prohibited. The beach offers water sport activities like parasailing and water skiing, among others.

Demographics
, Calangute had a population of 13,810. Males constituted 54% of the population and females 46%. Calangute had an average literacy rate of 73%, higher than the national average of 59.5%; male literacy was 78% and female literacy 67%. 10% of the population was under 6 years of age.

Government and politics
Calangute is part of Calangute (Goa Assembly constituency) and North Goa (Lok Sabha constituency).

Education
Calangute has secondary education schools viz. Little Flower of Jesus High School , St. Josephs High School, Don Bosco High School, Mark Memorial High School, apart from the Government Primary schools located in Umtavaddo & Naikavaddo.

In media
Lorna Cordeiro recorded a song in Konkani titled "Calangute" about the town and Calangute Beach.

Notable residents
 Bruno Coutinho – captained the India national football team.

Sports
Like any other Goan village, Calangute's most famous sport is football. The local football club is Calangute Association, which represents them in Goa's top-tier league, the Goa Professional League.

Gallery

References

External links

 

Beaches of Goa
Villages in North Goa district
Beaches of North Goa district